The Ministry of Parliamentary Affairs  is an Indian government ministry. It is headed by the Union Cabinet Minister of Parliamentary Affairs.

It handles affairs relating to the Parliament of India, and works as a link between the two chambers, the Lok Sabha ("House of the People," the lower house) and the Rajya Sabha ("Council of States," the upper house). It was created in 1949 as a department but later became a full ministry.

The Minister of Parliamentary Affairs holds cabinet rank as a member of the Council of Ministers. The current minister is Pralhad Joshi.
The Ministry of Parliamentary Affairs works under the overall direction of Cabinet Committee on Parliamentary Affairs.

The subject of ‘Nomination of Members of Parliament on Committees and other bodies set up by the Government’ has been allocated to the Ministry of Parliamentary Affairs under the Government of India (Allocation of Business) Rules, 1961 made by the President under article 77(3) of the Constitution.

Functions assigned to the Ministry under the Government of India (Allocation of Business) Rules, 1961 made by the President under Article 77(3) of the Constitution of India:-

Dates of summoning and prorogation of the two Houses of Parliament, Dissolution of Lok Sabha, President's Address to Parliament.
Planning and Coordination of legislative and other official business in both Houses.
Allocation of Government time in Parliament for discussion of motions given notice of by Members.
Liaison with Leaders and Whips of various Parties and Groups represented in Parliament.
Lists of Members of Select and Joint Committees on Bills.
Appointment of Members of Parliament on Committees and other bodies set up by Government.
Functioning of Consultative Committees of Members of Parliament for various Ministries.
Implementation of assurances given by Ministers in Parliament.
Governments stand on Private Members Bills and Resolutions.
Secretarial assistance to the Cabinet Committee on Parliamentary Affairs.
Advice to Ministries on procedural and other Parliamentary matters.
Coordination of action by Ministries on recommendations of general application made by Parliamentary Committees.
Officially sponsored visits of Members of Parliament to places of interest.
Matters connected with powers, privileges and immunities of Members of Parliament.
Parliamentary Secretaries - functions.
Organisation of Youth Parliament Competitions in Schools/Colleges throughout the country.
Organisation of All India Whips Conference.
Exchange of Government Sponsored Delegations of Members of Parliament with other countries.
Determination of Policy and follow up action in regard to matters raised under rule 377 of the Rules of Procedure and Conduct of Business in Lok Sabha and by way of Special Mentions in Rajya Sabha.
Manual for Handling Parliamentary work in Ministries/Departments.
The Salaries and Allowances of Officers of Parliament Act, 1953 (20 of 1953).
The Salary, Allowances and Pensions of Members of Parliament Act, 1954 (30 of 1954).
The Salary, and Allowances of Leaders of Opposition in Parliament Act, 1977 (33 of 1977).
The Leader and Chief Whips of Recognised Parties and Groups in  Parliament (Facilities) Act, 1998 (5 of 1999).

List of ministers

List of Ministers of State

References

External links
 Official website

Parliamentary Affairs
Parliament of India
Parliamentary affairs ministries
Lists of government ministers of India